Provincial Road 230, also known as McPhillips Road, is a provincial road in the Canadian province of Manitoba, in the Rural Municipality of St. Andrews.  It runs from PTH 8 (also McPhillips Road) to PTH 9 (Selkirk By-Pass).

External links 
Official Highway Map of Manitoba - Winnipeg

230